Ann Henricksson (born October 31, 1959) is an American former professional tennis player whose career spanned from 1981 to 1994.

She played two fourth-round Grand Slam matches: the Australian Open, (defeated by Zina Garrison), and at Wimbledon, (defeated by Monica Seles).

Henricksson won three WTA doubles tournaments.

WTA career finals

Singles (3 runners-up)

Doubles titles

Doubles runner-up

End of season ranking (singles)

References

External links
 
 

1959 births
Living people
American female tennis players
Tennis players at the 1979 Pan American Games
Pan American Games medalists in tennis
Pan American Games gold medalists for the United States
Pan American Games silver medalists for the United States
21st-century American women